The Cook County Courthouse in Adel, Georgia is a building built in 1939. It was designed by Atlanta architect William J. J. Chase and was built by the Ray M. Lee Company.  The Public Works Administration provided 45% of the funds.  It is a two-story brick building with limestone in the Stripped Classical style.  The steps a made of granite from Stone Mountain.  The original layout was a cross plan, with halls going to exterior doors on all four sides.  It has a flat roof and concrete foundation.  The county jail was originally south side.  The building was extended in 1973.  It was listed on the National Register of Historic Places in 1995.

References

External links
 

Courthouses on the National Register of Historic Places in Georgia (U.S. state)
Government buildings completed in 1939
Buildings and structures in Cook County, Georgia
County courthouses in Georgia (U.S. state)
National Register of Historic Places in Cook County, Georgia